Lower Meenmutty dam is a small dam Constructed across Kallar river in Nandiyodu Panchayath of Thiruvananthapuram District in Kerala, India. Lower Meenmutty weir is constructed as a part of Lower Meenmutty Small Hydro Electric Project. The scheme envisages the development of power by utilizing the water of river Kallar in the Vamanapuram basin. A power plant of 3.5 MegaWatt capacity generates the power using the waters from the dam. After the power generation the water flows to Kallar river and it further flows through Nedumangadu and Chirayinkeezhu.

Specifications
Latitude : 8⁰ 43′ 00 ” N
Longitude : 77⁰ 01′ 00” E	
Panchayath : Nandiyodu
Village : Nandiyodu	
District : Thiruvananthapuram	
River Basin : Kallar ar
River : Kallar ar	
Release from Dam to river : Kallar ar
Taluk through which release flows : Nedumangadu, Chirayinkeezhu
Year of completion  : 2005		
Name of Project : Lower Meenmutty SHEP	
Purpose of Project : Hydro Power	
Type of Dam	Concrete – Gravity
Classification	Weir
Maximum Water Level (MWL) : EL 64.50 m
Full Reservoir Level ( FRL) : EL 62.75 m
Storage at FRL	: 0.326 Mm3
Height from deepest foundation : 
Length : 
Spillway : Ogee – Overflow section- Ungated
Crest Level  : EL 62.75 m
River Outlet : 2 Nos. scour pipe 1.0 m diameter

Tourism around the Dam

Kerala State Electricity Board has developed hydel tourism projects around the dam which attracts tourists. It is located in an eco-friendly place that is surrounded by a forest on one side, situated on the shores of vamanapuram river. The popular activities at this destination includes boating, river rafting, and a travelling ice cream parlour.

External Links
Lower meenmutty SHEP

References

Dams in Kerala
Dams completed in 2005